Bill Cheng (born 1983) is a Chinese-American writer. He is best known for his novel Southern Cross The Dog. It follows the story of a boy who survives the Great Mississippi Flood of 1927 and then spends several decades as a refugee, an abandoned orphan and then an itinerant laborer. Cheng is known for his sardonic sense of humor and holds an MFA in writing at Hunter College.

Books

References 

Living people
American male writers
American writers of Chinese descent
1983 births
Writers from Queens, New York
Hunter College alumni